Lieutenant Colonel Roger Lloyd Kennion CIE (16 December 1866 - 26 March 1942) was an officer in the British Indian Army and travel writer. Educated at Monkton Combe School and at Repton School, he was first commissioned in 1887, entered the Central India Horse in 1890 and joined the Indian Foreign and Political Department in 1893, serving in Kashmir, Gilgit and Leh.  In 1907 Kennion was appointed Consul for the Districts of Seistan and Kain in Iran. In 1915 the then Lt. Colonel Kennion was appointed the Consul for Arabistan at Kermanshah.

He was appointed a Companion of the Order of the Indian Empire in the London Gazette of 1 January 1918 for meritorious service in connection with the war

He retired on 9 April 1922. and died in Petersfield, Hampshire in 1942.

In addition to his service, he was the author of several books about his travels in India and the surrounding countries. Kennion's correspondence papers with Lord Hardinge are recorded in the National Register of Archives

Kennion and his wife Marion had a daughter, Iris Alice (b. 1901 d. 1977).

List of Publications
 Sport and life in the further Himalaya. Edinburgh, London: W. Blackwood, 1910.
 By Mountain, lake, and plain : being sketches of sport in eastern Persia. Edinburgh ; London : W. Blackwood, 1911.
 Diversions of an Indian political  Edinburgh: W. Blackwood, 1932.

References

British Indian Army officers
People educated at Monkton Combe School
People educated at Repton School
Companions of the Order of the Indian Empire
British travel writers
Explorers of Central Asia
1866 births
1942 deaths